The Great Northwest Showcase is a bi-annual men's ice hockey tournament hosted by Simon Fraser University of the BCIHL. The Great Northwest Showcase is meant to showcase collegiate hockey in the Vancouver area, and create a platform to showcase BCIHL players to a variety of scouts.

Format 

Past Competitors Include:

 Simon Fraser University Clan
 University of North Dakota Fighting Hawks
 Princeton Tigers
 Arizona State Sun Devils
 Oklahoma Sooners
 University of British Columbia Thunderbirds

The tournament lasts two rounds, with the first-round opponents being rotated from year to year. The second round features the consolation game and the championship game.

History 

Originally created in 2012 to gauge collegiate hockey interest in the Vancouver area the tournament became a hit. The 2012 tournament played host to ACHA powerhouse Arizona State Sun Devils and the University of Oklahoma, and well as U Sports team UBC Thunderbirds. UBC would go on to win the championship that year. On the Friday SFU played the Oklahoma Sooners winning 4-0, UBC would play the Arizona State Sundevil's, winning 8-2. On the Saturday SFU played Arizona State losing 5-3. UBC would defeat Oklahoma 4-3 in overtime to claim the inaugural Great Northwest Showcase trophy.

In 2014 competition was ramped up as Simon Fraser University would host 8 time NCAA Men's Ice Hockey Champion, the #4 ranked University of North Dakota Fighting Hawks as well as two time ECAC champion Princeton Tigers. The UBC Thunderbirds were once again involved. Simon Fraser University played the Princeton Tigers on the Friday, with the Tigers claiming an 8-1 victory. UBC would play the University of North Dakota in the other Friday game winning 3-2 in overtime. On the Saturday, North Dakota would claim a 4-3 victory over Simon Fraser to clinch 3rd place. In the final, UBC defeated Princeton 1-0 to claim their second Great Northwest Showcase title in as many tries.

Results 

Four games are listed for each Great Northwest Showcase game. Winners are listed in bold. Games requiring overtime are indicated by (OT).

Statistics

Through the 2014 Great Northwest Showcase, the teams have amassed the following statistics:

Awards

See also 

 College Hockey
 College Rivalry
 Simon Fraser University Clan
 North Dakota Fighting Hawks
 Princeton Tigers
 Arizona State Sun Devils

References

College Hockey America